Delhi Public School, R. K. Puram (often referred to as DPS R. K. Puram or RKP) is a co-educational day and private boarding school educating pupils from 6th to 12th grade, located in the South Delhi district of New Delhi, India. It was founded in 1972 and was the second Delhi Public School to be established after Delhi Public School, Mathura Road.

The school often features at the top of various rankings for academic excellence. DPS R. K. Puram is affiliated to the Central Board of Secondary Education (CBSE) it is recognized by the Department of Education, Govt. of NCT Delhi, and the Ministry of HRD, Govt. of India.  It is also a member of the Indian Public Schools' Conference (IPSC) and the National Progressive Schools' Conference (NPSC).

History
Founded in 1972 in New Delhi, DPS R.K. Puram is a private institution run by the not-for-profit Delhi Public School Society.  Ms. Lathashishtha served as its first Headmistress.   It was the second school founded by the Delhi Public School Society, the first being the Delhi Public School at Mathura Road, and today serves as the Society's flagship school.

In 1978, Mr. R. S. Lugani was appointed as the school's first principal.   He served as Principal until 1992, and is credited with pioneering the "DPS R.K. Puram" system, which utilizes a combination of innovative teaching methods and a result-oriented curriculum and evaluation system in order to maintain consistently high academic standards.  In 1992, Mr. Lugani was awarded the Government of India's fourth highest civilian honor, the Padma Shri award, by then-President of India, R. Venkataraman for his contributions in the fields of Education and Literature.

Mr. Lugani was succeeded by then-Vice Principal, Dr. (Mrs.) Shayama Chona–an internationally renowned educationist and disability rights activist–who served as the school's Principal from 1992 until her retirement in August 2009.  Under her leadership, the school stewarded the establishment of the Tamana Special School, a school for the education of children with special needs. During her tenure, the school also began admitting students with visual and other impairments.  Dr Chona was conferred with the Padma Shri in 1999, and subsequently with the Government of India's third-highest civilian honor, the Padma Bhushan award in 2008–making her the only educationist to receive two of the country's four highest civilian honors.  In 2002, the school was felicitated at the "Computer Literacy Excellence Awards for Schools" by then-President of India A. P. J. Abdul Kalam as the "Best School at the State (Delhi) Level" and the second runner-up in the entire country. After Dr. Chona's retirement from the position of Principal in the year 2009, Dr. D.R. Saini served as Principal till March 2015, when he was succeeded by Ms. Vanita Sehgal. Ms. Sehgal was succeeded by Ms. Padma Srinivasan in April 2020. 

Since its founding, DPS R.K. Puram has maintained its standing as one of the most exclusive selective schools in India. In 2014, for example, 2,800 applications were received for 140 Nursery school spots this year, yielding an admissions rate of only 5 percent, which–as The New York Times noted–rivals that of top universities in the United States.

Current administration

Campus

The school is a day and boarding school with 9,500 students on its rolls.  It is situated in the heart of the South Delhi's urban area and has a campus of over 12 acres, along with a separate sports campus spread over 6 acres.

Hostel accommodation is also provided to more than 400 boarders from across the country. The hostel facility is separate for boys and girls. Competition for a place in one of the hostels is intense and is awarded on a merit-only basis.

Notable alumni

Academia 

 Abhiroop Mukhopadhyay – Professor in the Economics and Planning Unit, Indian Statistical Institute.
 Priyamvada Natarajan – Professor in the Departments of Astronomy and Physics, Yale University; Guggenheim Fellow.

Business 

 Kunal Bahl – Co-founder and CEO, Snapdeal.
 Rohit Bansal – Co-founder and COO, Snapdeal.
 Harsh Chitale – CEO, HCL Infosystems. 
 Aditya Julka – Co-founder and former CEO, Paddle8.
 Aradhya Malhotra – Co-founder of Skyless Game Studio.
 Ruchir Sharma – Head, Emerging Markets Equity, Morgan Stanley; international bestselling author of Breakout Nations and The Rise and Fall of Nations.

Film industry 

 Indrani Dasgupta – Bollywood actor and model.
 Randeep Hooda – Bollywood and independent film actor.
 Akshay Johar - Musician
 Amol Parashar – Bollywood actor
 Kriti Sanon - Bollywood actress
 Maneesh Sharma – Bollywood film director
 Shilpa Shukla – Bollywood and independent film actress
 Shweta Tripathi - Bollywood actress

Government 

 Ram Mohan Naidu Kinjarapu - One of the Youngest Members of Parliament in the 16th Lok Sabha and the National General Secretary of Telugu Desam Party
 Nikhil Kumar – Former Governor of Kerala [2013-14] and Nagaland [2009-2013]; former Delhi Police Commissioner; former Director General, NSG.
 Raghuram Rajan – 23rd Governor of the Reserve Bank of India.
 Parvesh Verma – Member, Parliament of India for West Delhi
 Tejashwi Yadav – Deputy Chief Minister, Bihar

Sports 

 Anjum Chopra - Cricketer
 Manavjit Singh Sandhu - Indian sports shooter

TV and print media 

 Ambika Anand – Anchor, NDTV.
 Ankit Fadia – Host of MTV What the Hack!
 Sagarika Ghose - Consulting Editor, The Times of India
 Vineet Malhotra – TV Anchor and Sports Personality. 
 Mini Mathur – VJ, MTV. 
 Mayank Shekhar – Journalist and Film Critic, Hindustan Times.
 Vishnu Som – Journalist and Prime Time News Anchor, NDTV.

Incidents 
The DPS MMS scandal of 2004 was a scandal caused by the unconsented sharing of an explicit video filmed by a student at the school. The scandal caused widespread sensation across India.

References

External links
 Official website

Educational institutions established in 1972
Schools in Delhi
Delhi Public School Society
CBSE Delhi
1972 establishments in Delhi